Tomás Irribarra (1935 – 25 December 2020) was a Chilean Radical Party politician who served as a member of the Chamber of Deputies and mayor of Quirihue.

References

1935 births
2020 deaths
People from Itata Province
Chilean people of Basque descent
Radical Party of Chile politicians
Deputies of the XLVI Legislative Period of the National Congress of Chile